Randolph County is located between the Ozark Mountains and Arkansas Delta in the U.S. state of Arkansas. The county is named for John Randolph, a U.S. senator from Virginia influential in obtaining congressional approval of the Louisiana Purchase, which includes today's Randolph County. Created as Arkansas's 32nd county on October 29, 1835, Randolph County has two incorporated cities, including Pocahontas, the county seat and most populous city. The county is also the site of numerous unincorporated communities and ghost towns.

Crossed by five rivers, most of Randolph County contains foothills and valleys typical of the Ozarks. However, the eastern side of the county is largely flat with fertile soils typical of the Delta, with the Black River roughly dividing the regions. The county contains three protected areas: two Wildlife Management Areas and Davidsonville Historic State Park, which preserves and interprets an early pioneer settlement. Other historical features such as log cabins, one-room school houses, community centers, and museums describe the history and culture of Randolph County.

Randolph County occupies  and contained a population of 18,571 as of the 2020 Census. The economy is largely based on agriculture and small manufacturing. Poverty and unemployment rates are above national averages, but steady. Household incomes are below state and national averages. Politically, Randolph County has transitioned from reliably Democratic to steadily Republican since the mid-20th century.

Randolph County is served by two school districts, Pocahontas School District and Maynard School District, and parts of three others. Higher education is provided at Black River Technical College, a public two-year community college in Pocahontas. St. Bernards Five Rivers Medical Center in Pocahontas is a community hospital providing primary care in the county. Although no Interstate highways serve Randolph County, the county has access to three United States highways (U.S. Route 62 [US 62], US 67, and US 412) and eleven Arkansas state highways. Randolph County is also served by one public owned/public use general aviation airport, Pocahontas Municipal Airport, and six community water systems provide potable water to customers in the county.

Geography

Randolph County is located where the foothills of the Ozark Mountains intersect the Arkansas Delta (in Arkansas, usually referred to as "the Delta") in the southeast part of the county. Two of the six primary geographic regions of Arkansas, the Ozarks are a mountainous subdivision of the U.S. Interior Highlands, and the Arkansas Delta is a subregion of the Mississippi Alluvial Plain, which is a flat area consisting of rich, fertile sediment deposits from the Mississippi River between Louisiana and Illinois. The Black River roughly divides the two regions in Randolph County.

Randolph County is surrounded by three Delta counties: Clay County to the east, Greene County to the southeast, Lawrence County to the south, one Ozark county, Sharp County, to the west, and two Missouri counties, Oregon County to the northwest, and Ripley County to the northeast.

Hydrology

Water is an extremely important part of Randolph County's geography, history, economy, and culture. The many rivers, streams, and ditches crossing the county have featured prominently since prehistoric times, and many of the hundreds of archaeological sites are along waterways. Tribes of Lenape, Shawnee,  and Cherokee were settled in the area along rivers but left the area following the 1811–12 New Madrid earthquakes.

Randolph County is home to five major rivers: Black River, Current River, Eleven Point River, Fourche River, and Spring River.

Running from east to west toward its own mouth in the southern tip of Randolph County, the Black receives the Current River and Fourche River east of Pocahontas. The Current River serves as the northeastern county boundary with Clay County before turning southwest, passing Reyno and Biggers and meeting the Black east of Pocahontas. The Fourche River enters Randolph County near Doniphan, Missouri and runs south to meet the Black east of Pocahontas. The Black meets the Spring at the southern tip of Randolph County near Black Rock.

The Spring River serves as the county's southwestern boundary with Lawrence County between Davidsonville Historic State Park and Ravenden. The Eleven Point River enters from Missouri near Billmore and runs south to empty into the Spring just west of the state park.

Rivers brought early prosperity to the county during white settlement for navigation. Control of the rivers and Pitman's Ferry led to military action in the county during the Civil War, including a skirmish in 1862. Following the war, natural mineral springs purported to have healing properties attracted visitors to Warm Springs and Ravenden Springs.

Protected areas
Randolph County contains one state park, Davidsonville Historic State Park, and two Wildlife Management Areas (WMAs), Dave Donaldson/Black River WMA and Robert L. Hankins/Mud Creek Upland WMA, owned by the Arkansas Game and Fish Commission.

Black River WMA preserves bottomland hardwood forest habitat and wintering habitat for migratory birds. Created in 1957, Black River WMA contains over  total and extends into Clay and Greene counties. The area is open to birding, hunting, and hiking.

Davidsonville Historic State Park is a 163-acre (66 ha) history state park focused on the interpretation and archaeology of the abandoned frontier town of Davidsonville. Once a very important stop on the Black River and Southwest Trail within Arkansaw Territory, Davidsonville was abandoned by 1836 following the decline of river transport and the shifting of the Southwest Trail. The park is owned and operated by the Arkansas Department of Parks and Tourism.

Demographics

2020 Census

As of the 2020 United States census, there were 18,571 people, 7,355 households, and 4,994 families residing in the county.

2010 Census

As of the 2010 census,  there were 17,969 people, 7,299 households, and 4,997 families residing in the county.  The population density was 27 people per square mile (10.6/km2). There were 8,513 housing units at an average density of 13 per square mile (5/km2). The racial makeup of the county was 96.5% White, 0.7% Black or African American, 0.5% Native American, 0.2% Asian, 0.7% from other races, and 1.4% from two or more races.  1.6% of the population were Hispanic or Latino of any race.

There were 7,299 households, out of which 30.5% had children under the age of 18 living with them, 53.1% were married couples living together, 10.7% had a female householder with no husband present, and 31.5% were non-families. 27.7% of all households were made up of individuals, and 14.1% had someone living alone who was 65 years of age or older.  The average household size was 2.41 and the average family size was 2.92.

In the county, the population was spread out, with 23.2% under the age of 18, 8.3% from 18 to 24, 22.7% from 25 to 44, 27.1% from 45 to 64, and 18.7% who were 65 years of age or older. The median age was 41.9 years. For every 100 females there were 96.2 males.  For every 100 females age 18 and over, there were 92.6 males.

2000 Census

As of the 2000 census, there were 18,195 people, 7,265 households, and 5,245 families residing in the county.  The population density was 28 people per square mile (11/km2).  There were 8,268 housing units at an average density of 13 per square mile (5/km2).  The racial makeup of the county was 96.99% White, 0.97% Black or African American, 0.53% Native American, 0.07% Asian, 0.01% Pacific Islander, 0.27% from other races, and 1.15% from two or more races.  0.82% of the population were Hispanic or Latino of any race.

There were 7,265 households, out of which 30.70% had children under the age of 18 living with them, 58.40% were married couples living together, 9.90% had a female householder with no husband present, and 27.80% were non-families. 24.70% of all households were made up of individuals, and 12.10% had someone living alone who was 65 years of age or older.  The average household size was 2.46 and the average family size was 2.93.

In the county, the population was spread out, with 24.60% under the age of 18, 8.30% from 18 to 24, 25.70% from 25 to 44, 24.30% from 45 to 64, and 17.00% who were 65 years of age or older.  The median age was 39 years. For every 100 females there were 96.00 males.  For every 100 females age 18 and over, there were 90.50 males.

Economy

Employment by sector in Randolph County is varied, led by professional services (26.8%), government employees and government enterprises (15.8%), trade (12.8%), agriculture (11.3%), and manufacturing (9.8%). A rural county with several small manufacturers, Randolph County consistently has an unemployment rate above state and national averages. As of October 2015, the Randolph County unemployment rate was 5.9%, down significantly from a peak of 10.3% in 2011 during the height of the Great Recession. For comparison, the unemployment rate was 4.9% statewide and 5.0% in the US in October 2015.

As of the 2000 Census, the median income for a household in the county was $27,583, and the median income for a family was $33,535. Males had a median income of $25,006 versus $18,182 for females. The per capita income for the county was $14,502.  About 11.90% of families and 15.30% of the population were below the poverty line, including 18.80% of those under age 18 and 15.20% of those age 65 or over.

Human resources

Education

Educational attainment in Randolph County is typical for a rural Arkansas county, with a 2012 study finding 82.5% of Randolph County residents over age 25 held a high school degree or higher and 13.4% holding a bachelor's degree or higher. The Randolph County rates are below Arkansas averages of 84.8% and 21.1%, and significantly below national averages of 86.7% and 29.8%, respectively.

Primary and secondary education

Two public school districts are based in Randolph County; the Pocahontas School District is the largest school district in Randolph County, with the Maynard School District serving the northeast corner of the county. Successful completion of the curriculum of these schools leads to graduation from Pocahontas High School or Maynard High School, respectively. Both high schools offer Advanced Placement (AP) courses, concurrent credit agreements with nearby Black River Technical College (BRTC), and are accredited by the Arkansas Department of Education (ADE). Additionally, Pocahontas HS is accredited by AdvancED.

Residents outside the two Randolph County-based districts are within either the Mammoth Spring School District, Sloan-Hendrix School District, Greene County Tech School District, or Corning School District.

Higher education
Randolph County contains one institution of higher education, Black River Technical College, a public community college in Pocahontas. Other higher education institutions in the region include two member institutions of the Arkansas State University System: Arkansas State University (ASU), a public four-year university in Jonesboro, and a public two-year satellite campus in Newport. Two private, four-year colleges are also near Randolph County: Crowley's Ridge College, a Christian liberal arts college in Paragould, and Williams Baptist College in Walnut Ridge.

Library system
The Randolph County Library (RCL) in downtown Pocahontas is a member library of the Northeast Arkansas Regional Library System. RCL offers books, e-books, media, reference, youth, business and genealogy services.

Public health
Randolph County's above-average poverty rate also indicates a high Medicaid eligibility rate. As of 2012, 38.1% of Randolph County was eligible for Medicaid, with 65.1% of children under 19 eligible for ARKids First, a program by the Arkansas Department of Human Services that combines children's Medicaid (ARKids A) and other programs for families with higher incomes (ARKids B). The county's population is significantly above healthy weight, with 71.7% of adults and 41.2% of children/adolescents ranking as overweight or obese, above the state averages of 67.1% and 39.3%, themselves significantly above national averages of 62.9% and 30.3%, respectively.

St. Bernards Five Rivers Medical Center in Pocahontas is a community hospital offering acute inpatient care, emergency care, diagnostics, surgery, rehabilitation, therapy, and senior care services. The facility is rated as a Level 4 Trauma Center by the Arkansas Department of Health. St. Bernards Medical Center in Jonesboro is a referral hospital in the region, focusing on heart care, cancer treatment, women's/children's services, and senior services.

The nearest Level 1 Trauma Centers are Le Bonheur Children's Hospital and Regional Medical Center, both in Memphis.

Public safety
The Randolph County Sheriff's Office is the primary law enforcement agency in the county. The agency is led by the Randolph County Sheriff, an official elected by countywide vote every four years.

The county is under the jurisdiction of the Randolph County District Court, a local district court. Local district courts in Arkansas are courts of original jurisdiction for criminal, civil, small claims, and traffic matters. Local district courts are presided over by an elected part-time judge who may privately practice law. Randolph County District Court is located at 1510 Pace Road in Pocahontas, and is presided over by the District Judge, who is elected in a countywide election. The court handles within Randolph County.

Superseding district court jurisdiction is the 3rd Judicial Circuit Court, which covers Jackson, Lawrence, Randolph, and Sharp counties. The 3rd Circuit contains three circuit judges, elected to six-year terms circuitwide.

Culture and contemporary life

Randolph County has several facilities, monuments, and museums dedicated to preserving the history and culture of the area. Several historic log structures remain in the county from the pioneer era. The Rice-Upshaw House, an 1820s-era log cabin near Dalton, is one of the oldest structures in Arkansas. Randolph County also includes Hillyard Cabin and the Looney-French House, both listed on the National Register of Historic Places.

The county contains several historic schools and community centers, including Cedar Grove School No. 81, a historic one room schoolhouse now used as a community center, the Eddie Mae Herron Center & Museum, a refurbished black school today serving as a community center and interpretative site, Old Union School in Birdell, and Ravenden Springs School.

Century Wall Monument, celebration of influential twentieth-century Americans
Davidsonville Historic State Park
Maynard Pioneer Museum, celebrates the early settlers
Old Randolph County Courthouse, restored 1875 courthouse in Pocahontas town square today used by Randolph County Chamber of Commerce

Randolph County voters approved sales of alcoholic beverages during a November 2018 election. Prior to the change taking effect in February 2019, Randolph County had been an alcohol prohibition or dry county for some 70 years.

Government

The county government is a constitutional body granted specific powers by the Constitution of Arkansas and the Arkansas Code. The quorum court is the legislative branch of the county government and controls all spending and revenue collection. Representatives are called justices of the peace and are elected from county districts every even-numbered year. The number of districts in a county vary from nine to fifteen, and district boundaries are drawn by the county election commission. The Randolph County Quorum Court has nine members. Presiding over quorum court meetings is the county judge, who serves as the chief operating officer of the county. The county judge is elected at-large and does not vote in quorum court business, although capable of vetoing quorum court decisions.

Politics
Since the late 20th century, Randolph County has transitioned from reliably Democratic to steady Republican in national, state and local elections. Except for the Catholic John F. Kennedy in 1960, major nationwide Republican victories for Richard Nixon (1972) and Ronald Reagan (1984), and the candidacy of Alabama Governor George Wallace in 1968, the county supported every Democratic presidential candidate between 1896 and 2004. Randolph County then supported Barack Obama’s opponents by roughly 3-to-2 margin, and supported Donald Trump with 70.7 percent of the vote.

In Congress, Arkansas has been represented by two Republican senators (John Boozman and Tom Cotton) since January 3, 2015, ending a long history of Democratic hegemony. In the House of Representatives, Randolph County is within the Arkansas 1st district with several other Ozark counties and many agricultural Delta counties on the eastern side of the state. The Arkansas 1st has been represented by Rick Crawford since 2010.

In the Arkansas State Senate, Randolph County is split between the 19th District and 20th District. Pocahontas and areas to the southeast are in the 20th along with Clay, Greene, Lawrence and a small portion of Craighead counties. Areas north or west of Pocahontas are in the 19th along with Izard, Sharp, Independence and a small portion of Fulton counties. The 19th has been represented by James Sturch (R) of Batesville since 2019, and the 20th has been represented by Blake Johnson (R) of Corning since 2015. In the Arkansas House of Representatives, Randolph County is split between the 56th District, 60th District, and 61st District. The eastern part of Randolph County is in the 56th District, which also includes Clay and most of Greene counties. Portions of Randolph County generally south and west of Pocahontas are represented by the 60th District, which also includes Lawrence County, most of Izard County, and a small portion of Greene County. The remainder of Randolph County, including Pocahontas, is represented by the 61st District, along with portions of Sharp and Fulton counties. These districts are represented by Joe Jett (R, since 2014), Frances Cavenaugh (R, since 2016), and Marsh Davis (R, since 2019), respectively.

Randolph County has produced some successful statewide politicians, including Thomas S. Drew, Third Governor of Arkansas, Edwin R. Bethune, U.S. Representative from Arkansas, Drew Bowers, Republican gubernatorial nominee in 1926 and 1928, and William Jasper Blackburn, a Reconstruction U.S. Representative from Louisiana.

Taxation

Property tax is assessed by the Randolph County Assessor annually based upon the fair market value of the property and determining which tax rate, commonly called a millage in Arkansas, will apply. The rate depends upon the property's location with respect to city limits, school district, and special tax increment financing (TIF) districts. This tax is collected by the Randolph County Collector between the first business day of March of each year through October 15th without penalty. The Randolph County Treasurer disburses tax revenues to various government agencies, such as cities, county road departments, fire departments, libraries, and police departments in accordance with the budget set by the quorum court.

Sales and use taxes in Arkansas are voter approved and collected by the Arkansas Department of Finance and Administration.
Arkansas's statewide sales and use tax has been 6.5% since July 1, 2013. Randolph County has an additional sales and use tax of 1.25%, which has been in effect since January 1, 1999. Within Randolph County, the City of Pocahontas has an additional 2% sales and use tax since October 1, 2013, and the Town of Maynard an additional 1.5% sales and use tax since April 1, 2012. The Arkansas State Treasurer disburses tax revenue to counties/cities in accordance with tax rules.

Communities
Two incorporated cities and four incorporated towns are located within the county. The largest city and county seat, Pocahontas, is located in the south-central part of the county on the Black River. Pocahontas' population in 2010 was 6,608, and has been increasing since the 1960 Census. The county's small towns all have a population under 500 as of the 2010 Census, with Ravenden Springs the smallest at 118 in western Randolph County. The remaining communities are in the Delta portion of the county: Maynard north of Pocahontas, Biggers and Reyno (the other city) along US 67 near the county's eastern border, and O'Kean in the southeastern corner.

Randolph County has dozens of unincorporated communities and ghost towns within its borders. This is due to early settlers in Arkansas tending to settle in small clusters rather than incorporated towns. For example, communities like Davidsonville had a post office and dozens of buildings at some point in their history. Other communities are simply a few dwellings at a crossroads that have adopted a common place name over time. Some are officially listed as populated places by the United States Geological Survey, and others are listed as historic settlements.
Ravenden Springs

Cities
 Pocahontas (County Seat)
 Reyno

Towns
 Biggers
 Maynard
 O'Kean
 Ravenden Springs

Unincorporated communities

 Antioch
 Attica
 Birdell
 Brakebill
 Brockett
 Cedar Grove
 Dalton
 Dunn
 East Pocahontas
 Elevenpoint
 Elkins Park
 Elm Store
 Elnora
 Engelberg
 Fender
 Glaze Creek
 Gravesville
 Hamil
 Hoover Landing
 Ingram
 Jerrett
 Lesterville
 Lorine
 Manson
 Middlebrook
 Minorca
 Noland
 Old Reyno
 Old Siloam
 Palestine
 Pitman
 Shannon
 Sharum
 Skaggs
 Stokes
 Stoney Point
 Supply
 Warm Springs
 Washington

Historical communities

 Baker Den
 Davidsonville
 Debrow
 Keller
 Kingsville
 Mock
 Oconee
 Poluca
 Running Lake
 Watervalley
 Yadkin

Townships

 Baker
 Bristow
 Butler
 Columbia
 Current River (Biggers)
 Dalton
 Demun (Pocahontas)
 East Roanoke
 Eleven Point
 Foster
 Ingram
 Jackson
 Janes Creek (Ravenden Springs)
 Little Black
 O'Kean (O'Kean)
 Reyno (Reyno)
 Richardson (Maynard)
 Running Lake
 Shiloh
 Siloam
 Spring River
 Union
 Warm Springs
 Water Valley
 West Roanoke
 Wiley

Infrastructure

Aviation
Randolph County contains one public owned/public use general aviation airport, Pocahontas Municipal Airport (Nick Wilson Field) in Pocahontas. For the twelve-month period ending August 31, 2014, the facility saw 7,000 general aviation operations. The nearest commercial service airport is Memphis International Airport.

Major highways

Randolph County is not served by any Interstate highways; the nearest access to the Interstate system is Interstate 555 (I-555) in Jonesboro. The county does serve as a junction for several US highways, with US 62 crossing the county from east to west. This highway runs across much of northern Arkansas, giving Randolph County access to Mountain Home, Harrison, Eureka Springs, and Fayetteville to the west. US 62 intersects US 67 in Pocahontas, forming a two route overlap to the northeast toward Poplar Bluff, Missouri. US 67 runs south from Pocahontas to Walnut Ridge, where it becomes a controlled-access highway running south to Little Rock, the state capital. (US 67 will be upgraded to Interstate 57 (I-57) in the future from the Missouri state line to Little Rock.) A short business spur of US 67 connects Biggers to the state highway system.

Eleven state highways serve the traveling public in the county, varying from short connector routes to long highways traversing the entire county. Highway 34 and Highway 90 run east–west across the county, with the latter connecting Ravenden Springs to Pocahontas. Highway 93, Highway 115, Highway 166, and Highway 251 all run north to the Missouri state line to connect with Missouri state routes. Highway 328 connects Maynard to state highways to the east and west. A second segment of Highway 166 and Highway 361 connect Davidsonville Historic State Park to nearby population centers. Highway 304 connects Pocahontas to Delaplaine, with a short alternate route, Highway 304N running around Pocahontas Municipal Airport. Two instances of Highway 231 serve as connectors between other major state highways.

Utilities

The Arkansas Department of Health (ADH) is responsible for the regulation and oversight of public water systems throughout the state. Randolph County contains six community water systems: Biggers Water Department, City of Maynard, O'Kean Water System, Pocahontas Water and Sewer, Ravenden Springs Waterworks, Reyno Water Department, as well as portions of Clay County Regional Water Distribution District (CCRWDD), Northeast Arkansas Public Water Authority (NEAPWA), and Lawrence County Regional Water District. Pocahontas W&S has the largest retail population in the county (7,547), with all others under 500 accounts served. Of the water systems serving Randolph County, only Pocahontas and NEAPWA use surface water (the Black River and Spring River, respectively) for source water; all others use groundwater wells or purchase from neighboring utilities.

Notable people
Joseph J. Alexander, Randolph County's first representative at Arkansas' first State Assembly after becoming a state. He was killed 4 Dec 1837 by the Speaker of the House, John Wilson, during a knife fight on the floor of the assembly chamber.
George Nicholas 'Nick' Wilson (1942 - ), former Arkansas lawyer and political leader who served in the Arkansas Senate for almost 30 years.

See also
 National Register of Historic Places listings in Randolph County, Arkansas

Notes

References

External links
Randolph County Chamber of Commerce
Randolph County Tourism Association
Randolph County Sheriff's Office

 
1835 establishments in Arkansas Territory
Populated places established in 1835